Grohe is a German plumbing fixtures manufacturer with its registered office in Hemer and headquarters in Düsseldorf. Since 2014, Grohe has been part of the Japanese Lixil Group. Grohe employs about 6,000 people worldwide.

History

1911 until 1990: family-owned 

The company started as a ferric hardware factory in 1911 under the name Berkenhoff & Paschedag, located in Hemer, Germany; it was taken over by Friedrich Grohe in 1936, who focused on sanitary faucets only. Before that, Friedrich used to work for his father's company Hansgrohe, founded in 1901. The first order from outside of Germany came in 1938. In 1948, the company was renamed to Friedrich Grohe Armaturenfabrik. In 1956, Grohe purchased Carl Nestler Armaturenfabrik with its factory in Lahr/Schwarzwald. In the same year, the company launched the Skalatherm, an automatic mixing valve with integrated thermostat. In 1961, the company set up its first subsidiary abroad, in France. A year later in 1962, Grohe acquired exclusive rights to produce the Moen Mixing Faucet, which mixes hot and cold water with a single lever. In 1965, the company expanded into Austria and founded its third subsidiary abroad in Italy in 1967.

In 1968, Friedrich Grohe sold a 51% stake, there were some additions to the Lahr production site and a new logistics department was opened at Hemer-Edelburg.

In 1983, the company's products were exclusively distributed in the Middle East, the East Mediterranean as well as North and West Africa by Grome Marketing. Later in 1993, Grohe acquired 50% of Grome, resulting in a joint venture between Mesma Holdings Ltd. and Grohe AG.

1990s and 2000s: involvement of investors 

In 1991, the company bought two other producers of faucets: Herzberger Armaturen GmbH from the Brandenburg region and Armaturenfabrik H. D. Eichelberg & Co. GmbH at Iserlohn in Westphalia. Grohe was also restructured as a public limited company. By taking over the DAL Group in 1994, the company acquired a production site in Porta Westfalica, Westphalia; at the same time, the company also acquired Tempress Ltd. of Mississauga in Ontario (Canada). At the Hemer site, new technology and factory control facilities were opened. 1996 saw the company expand to Portugal and Thailand. A new design centre followed at the Hemer site in 1997.

In 1998, a group of investors working with BC Partners bought all available Grohe shares and delisted the company in the following year, making the Grohe Holding GmbH company, owned by BC partners, into the majority owner of Grohe AG in 1999. BC partners sold the company to a consortium of investors from the Texas Pacific Group and CSFB Private Equity (a subsidiary of the Swiss Credit Suisse banking group) five years later in 2004.

In 2005, Franz Müntefering, chairman of the then ruling Social Democratic Party of Germany (SPD), sparked a debate on capitalism by designating foreign private equity firms as "locusts". He made TPG-owned Grohe his main example. The "locust" metaphor remained popular in German politics and media for years. On the other hand, a report commissioned by the German government's finance ministry cited Grohe as an example for a successful turnaround, less than three years after Müntefering's statement.

The company’s sales and profit figures had been stagnating for years, leading to a programme of savings as of 2007. Around 950 production jobs were announced to be cut at sites in Germany and the Herzberg factory was closed; the sites in Thailand and Portugal were expanded considerably and around 500 new jobs created. Through 2008, investments totaling 200 million euros were made, of which around two thirds were invested in Germany in the areas of production technology and logistics.

2010-present: recent history 

Grohe is currently Europe’s biggest manufacturer of sanitary fittings and has eight percent of the worldwide market. The German market makes up roughly 15 percent of overall sales. Currently, Grohe AG is owned almost 100% by Grohe Holding GmbH (there are still some minority shareholders from the period in which Grohe AG was listed on the stock market). Grohe Holding GmbH is owned by investors.

In June 2010, the company saw a ruling against the European sanitary fittings industry by the European Commission. The Commission found that European manufacturers had operated a cartel between 1992 and 2002 and imposed a collective fine of 622 million euros. Grohe's share of the fine amounted to 54.8 million euros. The Grohe board of directors, which took up business after the period under investigation, introduced awareness programmes about competition law and operates a zero-tolerance policy towards price-fixing.

In early 2011, Grohe acquired a majority stake in the leading Chinese sanitary fittings producer Joyou, making a successful public takeover bid. The aim of this takeover is above all to strengthen Grohe’s sales infrastructure on the fast-growing Asian market. Grohe currently holds a 72 percent stake in Joyou.

In 2012, Grohe AG's revenues increased by 21 percent to 1,405 million euros; operating profits improved by 18 percent to reach 273 million euros, representing a return on revenue of 19.4 percent. 

In May 2013, David Haines, chairman of Grohe, confirmed that, although the company is examining all options for ending investor involvement, no concrete plans had yet been made. Capital market experts estimate that Grohe would currently be valued at up to four billion euros if it were to return to the stock market.

In September 2013, it was announced that Grohe had received the largest ever investment from a Japanese company in Germany. The firm is now almost entirely owned by the Japanese building materials company Lixil Group and the Development Bank of Japan, after a €3 billion deal for 87.5 percent of the firm.

Grohe was taken over by Lixil and the Development Bank of Japan in January 2014.

In February 2017, the company's revenues accounted 965 million euros during the first nine months of the fiscal year. Grohe claimed their solid growth is based on their international marketshares with Grohe products available in 150 countries as well as increasing sales in Germany.

In May 2017, Grohe announced the takeover of the former joint venture Grome.

In September 2017, Grohe was listed in the Change the World ranking of the business magazine Fortune as one of 50 international companies whose strategy have a positive impact on society.

Corporate Structure
The registered office of Grohe AG is located in Hemer and the head office in Düsseldorf, Germany. Grohe AG is a subsidiary of Grohe Holding GmbH. Grohe Holding GmbH is wholly owned by Grohe Group S.à.r.l., which gets consolidated by its parent company Lixil Group.

The company's Management Board consists of four members and is led by Thomas Fuhr as chairman of the board. Other members are Jonas Brennwald as Deputy CEO, Stefan Gesing as Chief Financial Officer, and Michael Mager as Executive Director Human Resources & Organization.

The Supervisory Board of Grohe AG is composed of an equal numbers of six employee representatives and six shareholder representatives. The Chairman of the Supervisory Board is Kinya Seto, Chief Executive Officer of the LIXIL Group.

Grohe in the U.S.

In 1975, Grohe opened a small office just outside Chicago, and its representative, Urell, Inc. in Massachusetts, began supplying European-style kitchen and bathroom fixtures to American tradesmen and retailers. The new venture was incorporated a year later as Grohe America, Inc. and moved into a small warehouse-office complex. In order to keep pace with its rapid growth, the company regularly upsized its premises: a section of a larger warehouse facility in 1978, a whole warehouse in Wood Dale in 1986, and finally settled into today’s custom-built 90,000 square-foot facility in Bloomingdale, Illinois, in 1993.

Sales figures doubled year after year as Grohe introduced a series of products such as the Ladylux of 1983 – the first pull-out spray kitchen faucet, including detachable hand-spray and snap-on accessories (also the first hand-spray with a filter for drinking water), on the US market – or the Europlus of 1989, another pull-out spray faucet. In the early 1990s, Grohe introduced a new designer finish "white" which increased sales for the next 7 years. Introduction of clear powder-coating in the 1980s resulted in the advent of polished brass and other finishes having superior adhesion, solving a major problem in the industry. In the late 1990s, Grohe replaced the powder-coated first generation of these products with stainless steel versions. 

1979 saw the launch of the Grohmix thermostat line, able to regulate water temperature to an accuracy of one degree Fahrenheit. In 1980, Grohe also implemented water-temperature regulation technology.

These shower systems saw Grohe America take the step of advertising directly to consumers. For commercial customers, Grohe introduced a new product line in 1989, following it up with a showroom marketing program for wholesalers. In 1996, Grohe America launched its first television advertisement campaign and started offering a limited lifetime warranty in 1997. By the mid-1990s, Grohe America was selling fixtures with a value of $38 million annually, with a market share of 1.7 percent.

Grohe opened a 15,000 square-foot showroom for professional partners and visitors on Fifth Avenue in New York City in September 2011. In February 2012, Grohe announced its US headquarters will move from Bloomingdale, Illinois to New York City.

References

External links
 Official website

German brands
Companies based in Düsseldorf
Manufacturing companies established in 1936
Private equity portfolio companies
Bathroom fixture companies
Lixil Group
1936 establishments in Germany
2014 mergers and acquisitions
Hemer